The Unionville Curling Club is a privately owned 4-sheet curling club located in Unionville, Ontario. The club was founded in 1919, and is an active member of Curling Canada, CurlON, and Toronto Curling Association.

Notable members
Hollie Duncan
Kim Gellard
Ray Grant
Shane Konings
Lauren Wasylkiw

External links
Unionville Curling Club

Curling clubs in Canada
1919 establishments in Ontario
Curling in Ontario
Sport in Markham, Ontario
Curling clubs established in 1919